Between 15 June and 17 June 2014, more than 60 people were killed in attacks in and near Mpeketoni, Kenya. The Somalia-based Al-Shabaab militant group claimed responsibility, but the Kenyan President Uhuru Kenyatta asserted that the attacks were organized by local politicians with ties to a network of gangs. Correspondents from the area suggested that the attacks may have been motivated by ethnic or religious hatred, or revenge for land grabbing.

First attack
On 15 June 2014, about 50 masked gunmen hijacked a van and raided a police station in the predominantly Christian town of Mpeketoni, Kenya.  According to a local policeman, the gunmen then shot men at random as women were forced to watch. The assailants also burned hotels, restaurants, and government offices.

According to Kenyan President Uhuru Kenyatta, the Mpeketoni police received warning of the attack ahead of time, but did not act on the warning. The newspaper's investigation suggested police had ignored calls for help, in some cases turning off their radios. Others were watching World Cup games and did not receive notice of the situation. An eyewitness said he was told police vehicles did not have sufficient fuel to respond to his distress call. The police commissioner, who was reportedly suspended after the attack, stated "We responded robustly but we were overwhelmed."

After the attacks, angry local Kenyans brandishing weapons subsequently took to Mpeketoni's streets in protest.

At least 53 people were reportedly killed during the attack, and eight others were unaccounted for as of 18 June. Most of the dead Kenyans were Kikuyus.

Second attack
On 17 June 2014, assailants set fire to houses in the villages of Majembeni and Poromoko, near Mpeketoni. Initial reports also said twelve women were abducted during the raid, although that was later proven incorrect.

After the second attack, Kenyan security forces located a group of suspects armed with AK-47's fleeing from Mpeketoni. Five of the suspects were killed in a gun battle with security forces, while an undetermined number of others escaped.

Perpetrators
Although no group immediately claimed responsibility for the first attack, Kenyan army spokesman Major Emmanuel Chirchir said the "assailants [are] likely to be Al-Shabaab".

Al-Shabab claimed responsibility for the second attack, saying its members had killed 20 people. Kenyatta asserted that local politicians, who were connected with a network of gangs, had instigated the attacks, and dismissed Al-Shabaab's claim of responsibility.

Many locals accused the Kenyan government of attempting to enrich Kikuyus by giving them land. This grievance was also behind the fatal ethnic violence that took place following the disputed 2007 Kenyan elections. President Kenyatta, a Kikuyu himself, described the attacks as "politically motivated ethnic violence against a Kenyan community, with the intention of profiling and evicting them for political reasons". The opposition leader Raila Odinga, who Kenyatta had defeated in the 2013 general election, denied involvement in the violence and suggested that Kenyatta's remarks were "unfortunate and unjustified".

Correspondents from the area conjectured that ethnic Somali or Oromo residents may have perpetrated the attack and attempted to deflect blame onto Al-Shabaab by using the group's flag as a guise.

On 25 June, Lamu County Governor Issa Timamy was arrested on charges related to the attack.

References

Attacks in Africa in 2014
Terrorist incidents in Kenya in 2014
2014 murders in Kenya
Terrorist incidents in Kenya
Mass murder in 2014
Mass shootings in Africa
Arson in Kenya
Hijacking
Attacks on police stations in the 2010s
Islamic terrorism in Kenya
Islamic terrorist incidents in 2014
Massacres of men
Violence against men in Africa